Stay Here is an American reality television series on Netflix that focuses on home improvements. The show's first season of 8 episodes was released on Netflix on August 17, 2018. It features Genevieve Gorder, an interior designer, and Peter Lorimer, a real estate broker, transforming homeowners' short-term rental homes into moneymakers across the United States. Episodes include a houseboat in Seattle, Washington, a brownstone in Brooklyn, New York, and a firehouse in Washington, D.C.

Main cast
 Genevieve Gorder
 Peter Lorimer

Episodes

References

External links 
 
 

English-language Netflix original programming
2018 American television series debuts
2010s American reality television series